Cheng Weigao (September 1933 – December 28, 2010) was a Chinese politician, best known for his term as the Communist Party Secretary for Hebei province between 1993 and 1998. In his late career, Cheng was expelled from the Chinese Communist Party in 2003 after a corruption investigation. He was demoted, but not charged. 

Cheng's son, Cheng Muyang (Michael Ching), lives in Vancouver, Canada as of 2015.

Biography
Cheng was born in Suzhou, Jiangsu Province.  He followed his parents to neighboring Changzhou in his teenage years. He entered the Communist Youth League organization in Changzhou in 1949, and joined the Chinese Communist Party about a year later.  In 1959, he became a secretary to the deputy party chief of Chengdu. In 1965, he was named head of the tractor factory in Changzhou. In 1972, he was transferred to work at the Shanghuang Mine. In 1980 he was named deputy mayor of Changzhou, then in 1983 named party chief of Changzhou.

Cheng served as the Communist Party Secretary of Nanjing between February 1984 and July 1987, and became a member of the provincial Party Standing Committee. He was then Governor of Henan between 1988 and July 1990. Then he was transferred to become governor of Hebei, an office he held until January 1993, when he was promoted to Party Secretary of Hebei. He served as the provincial party chief until 1998, when he began serving as Chairman of the provincial People's Congress.

In January 2003, Cheng resigned as Chairman of the Hebei People's Congress and immediately headed back to Changzhou.  He then lived in a mansion-complex named Yuyuan for the remainder of his life. In August 2003, following an investigation by the Central Commission for Discipline Inspection, Cheng was expelled from the Chinese Communist Party for violating party discipline by aiding and abetting activities of his son and others. He was not charged with any criminal wrongdoing, but was demoted one level from full provincial status to sub-provincial level.  

In 2010 he died. His death was mourned by some Changzhou residents.

Until the corruption case of Hebei party chief Zhou Benshun in 2015, Cheng was the only Hebei party leader in history to have been accused of corruption-related offenses by the party's top disciplinary body, the Central Commission for Discipline Inspection.

Cheng's son, Cheng Muyang (Michael Ching), lives in Vancouver, Canada as of 2015.

References

1933 births
2010 deaths
People's Republic of China politicians from Jiangsu
Expelled members of the Chinese Communist Party
Members of the 15th Central Committee of the Chinese Communist Party
Members of the 14th Central Committee of the Chinese Communist Party
Members of the 13th Central Committee of the Chinese Communist Party
Politicians from Suzhou
Governors of Henan
Governors of Hebei